Booker T. Washington High School, also known as Grant Junior High School and Grant Elementary, is a historic high school building located near London, Kanawha County, West Virginia.  It was built in 1925, and is a two-story, "L"-shaped wire brick building with a rear section in tile block and brick.  It is in the Streamline Moderne style.  It was built as a high school for African American children during the period of segregated educational facilities.  After desegregation in 1956, it was used as a junior high school, then an elementary school.  The school closed in June 1986, and is now used as a community center.  It was one of two early high schools for African Americans in Kanawha County.

It was listed on the National Register of Historic Places in 1999.

See also 
 List of things named after Booker T. Washington

References

External links 

 Booker T. Washington Community Center
UKVSAC at the Booker T. Washington Community Center

Defunct schools in West Virginia
Educational institutions disestablished in 1956
Educational institutions disestablished in 1989
Educational institutions established in 1925
Former school buildings in the United States
Historically segregated African-American schools in West Virginia
National Register of Historic Places in Kanawha County, West Virginia
1925 establishments in West Virginia
Schools in Kanawha County, West Virginia
School buildings on the National Register of Historic Places in West Virginia
Streamline Moderne architecture in West Virginia